Mysteries  may refer to:

 Sacred mysteries in ancient esoteric religions
 "The Mysteries: Renaissance Choros", a 1931 poem by H.D.
 Mysteries (album), a 1975 jazz album by Keith Jarrett
 Mysteries (novel), an 1892 psychological novel
 The Mysteries, a 1977 English play cycle
 The Mysteries (album), a 2013 album by composer John Zorn
 Mysteries, a series of novels set in the Forgotten Realms of Dungeons & Dragons
 Mysteries at the Museum, a television program on the Travel Channel.

See also

 Mystery (disambiguation)